was a Japanese yonkoma shōnen/seinen manga magazine published by Kadokawa Shoten. The magazine existed between 2011 and 2013.

Series
Aiura (Chama)
Black Rock-chan (Ringo) (April 2011 - March 2012)
Chotto Kawaii Iron Maiden (Makoto Fukami, Alpha Alf Layla)
Eureka Seven nAnO (2012 – January 2013)
G's Under Ground (Purapa)
G-Sen Rough Sketch (Sakyū Tottori)
Lucky Star (Kagami Yoshimizu)
The Melancholy of Haruhi-chan Suzumiya (Puyo) (2007 - )
Magical Record Lyrical Nanoha Force Dimension
Nichijō (Keiichi Arawi)
Chima R-15 (Nenga Ninomiya)
Sora no Kyūsoku (Suka)
Strike Witches Gekijōban: 501 Butai Hasshin Shimasu-! (Makoto Fujibayashi)
Upotte!! (Kitsune Tennouji)

References

External links
 
 

2011 establishments in Japan
2013 disestablishments in Japan
Anime magazines published in Japan
Defunct magazines published in Japan
Kadokawa Shoten magazines
Magazines established in 2011
Magazines disestablished in 2013
Magazines published in Tokyo
Seinen manga magazines
Shōnen manga magazines
Yonkoma